Saturday Date with Billy O'Connor is a Canadian variety television series which aired on CBC Television from 1958 to 1959.

Premise
Billy O'Connor, a musician who previously hosted CBC series such as The Billy O'Connor Show and Club O'Connor, was seen in this series with performers Allan Blye and Vanda King. The series house band was a quartet featuring an accordionist (Vic Centro), a bassist (Jackie Richardson), a drummer (Doug McLeod) and a guitarist (Kenny Gill).

Scheduling
This half-hour series was broadcast on Saturdays at 7:30 p.m. (Eastern time) from 4 October 1958 to 27 June 1959, prior to the hockey broadcast during the National Hockey League season.

References

External links
 

CBC Television original programming
1950s Canadian variety television series
1958 Canadian television series debuts
1959 Canadian television series endings
Black-and-white Canadian television shows